Loyola University Stadium was a multi-purpose stadium in New Orleans. It was home to the Loyola University Wolf Pack football team and track and field team. The stadium opened in 1928.

The stadium was a double-decker stadium with a track surrounding the grass playing field. It was located on Freret Street at Calhoun Street between Bobet Hall and the gymnasium. It hosted the first collegiate night game in the southern United States. 

The stadium also hosted high school football games.

See also
Loyola Wolf Pack

References

American football venues in New Orleans
Athletics (track and field) venues in New Orleans
Defunct athletics (track and field) venues in the United States
Defunct college football venues
Defunct multi-purpose stadiums in the United States
Defunct sports venues in New Orleans
Demolished sports venues in Louisiana
High school football venues in Louisiana
Loyola Wolf Pack football
Sports venues completed in 1928
1928 establishments in Louisiana